Virals is the first novel in the Virals series of novels for young adults written by the American forensic anthropologist and crime writer, Kathy Reichs, and her son Brendan Reichs, featuring Tory Brennan, great-niece of Temperance Brennan.

It is the first of Reichs's novels to be written specifically for a young-adult audience.

Plot
Tory and her friends, Hiram (mostly known as Hi), Ben, and Shelton, find a rusted dog tag dating from the Vietnam War era on Loggerhead Island; trying to identify its owner leads them to an unsolved murder and infection by an experimental virus that gives them special powers, which they describe as "flaring". Their powers include super strength, speed and senses.  They acquire the infection while saving a wolfdog being used for illegal experiments by Dr. Karsten, who was funded by a company which belongs to Chance Claybourne's Dad.

Meanwhile, they discover a skeleton, which proves to be that of the daughter of the owner of the dog-tag. Someone shoots at them, forcing them to run. They manage to escape, but the next time they visit (with their parents and a police officer), the skeleton has been replaced with monkey bones. They are called 'over imaginative children' and the police leave it at that.

Being curious, Tory and her friends want to find out who committed the murder; using their powers, they crack the case.

Characters
Additional to the recurring characters of the series, the following characters appear.

Dr. Marcus E. Karsten - Professor and Department Chair at Charleston University College of Veterinary Medicine; Head Administrator at LIRI (Loggerhead Island Research Institute). Dr Karsten is described by Tory as "Late fifties, skinny, glasses, dark, thinning hair worn in the ever-popular comb-over." Dr Karsten was being paid by Candela Pharmaceuticals to research a cure for canine parvovirus or, failing that, to create a new "designer virus" that only a Candela product could cure. However, while trying to find a mechanism to weaken the canine strain, he accidentally created a new type of parvovirus which had the potential to infect humans. By mixing two types of parvovirus (one that infects humans and another that infects dogs), he created a new strand called PARVOVIRUS XPB-19. Dr Karsten is often annoyed that Tory and her friends come to Loggerhead and makes life difficult for them. When unknown enemies threatened to kill the Virals, Karsten stayed behind so the others could get away, and he was killed.
Hannah Wythe – She was Chance Claybourne's girlfriend. She is described as having long auburn hair and green eyes. She had Karsten murdered at the Viral's bunker after he tried to defend them. She later attempts to kill the Virals in the cellar of Claybourne Manor. It is there that she reveals that she had been working with Chance's father behind his back so that Chance wouldn't ruin their future together. She is later arrested along with Chance's driver for the murder of Karsten.
Hollis Claybourne – He is Chance Claybourne's father. He is extremely strict and raised Chance single-handedly, as his wife, Sally Claybourne died in childbirth. He was a vice president of Candela Pharmaceuticals. He murdered Katherine Heaton (before the events of this book) after she found out about bald eagles nesting on Cole Island, as that would have hindered the sale of the island. He is later arrested for the murder of Katherine Heaton and many other crimes.
Tony Baravetto – He was previously the driver to Chance Claybourne. Hollis Claybourne made him stalk Tory and the other Virals, and he was later sent to murder Tory, Hi, Ben and Shelton at the bunker, but they escaped, leaving Karsten behind. He killed Karsten and dumped his body at sea. At Claybourne Manor, he attacked Tory in the kitchen, but she managed to take him down. He was later arrested along with Chance's former girlfriend, Hannah Wythe, for the murder of Dr Marcus Karsten and four counts of attempted murder.

Publishing history
Virals was first published in the United States on November 2, 2010, by Razorbill, an imprint of Penguin Books, and published in the UK the same year by Young Arrow, an imprint of Random House. It has had several subsequent English language editions in hardback, paperback, ebook, and audiobook. The book has also been published in French (as Viral, Pocket, 2011), German  (Verlagsgruppe Random House GmbH, 2011), and Italian  (Rizzoli, 2011)

Reviews
 Kirkus review

References

External links
Virals series official website
Virals on WorldCat

Novels by Kathy Reichs
American young adult novels
2010 American novels
Novels set in South Carolina
Children's science fiction novels
Children's mystery novels
Razorbill books